The Busan Sajik Baseball Stadium is a baseball stadium in Sajik-dong, Dongnae-gu, Busan, South Korea. It was built in 1985 and is the home stadium of KBO club Lotte Giants. It has a seating capacity of 24,500. It is known as a mecca for Korean baseball.

The stadium can be accessed via Sajik station which is on Busan Metro Line 3.

References

1985 establishments in South Korea
Baseball venues in South Korea
Dongnae District
Lotte Giants
Sports venues completed in 1985
Sports venues in Busan
Venues of the 2002 Asian Games
Asian Games baseball venues
20th-century architecture in South Korea